Brunswick Valley Heritage Park, also known as Mullumbimby Heritage Park, is a rainforest arboretum and recreation park located on the banks of the Brunswick River in Mullumbimby, north-eastern New South Wales, Australia. Established in 1980, the arboretum has 300 species of local rainforest trees grown from seeds and cuttings collected from the surrounding forests.
It is open every day of the year and access is free.

History 
The Mullumbimby district is in the heart of what was once the Big Scrub, 900 square kilometres of predominantly sub-tropical rainforest, on the Mount Warning caldera. Botanically, this region is known as the  MacPherson–Macleay Overlap - an area of eastern Australia where tropical and temperate zones overlap: the wetter slopes typically have tropical vegetation and the drier, cooler, open parts have temperate vegetation.
This area has been inhabited for many thousands of years by people of the Bundjalung nation. For the last 150 years, colonisation, forestry, and clearing for agriculture decimated the  Big Scrub and other areas of lowland rainforest leaving only small remnants of the original forests on steep slopes and less accessible places.
 
In 1980, the Byron Flora and Fauna Conservation Society, a group of local residents led by Russ and Beryl Maslen, was given responsibility and some support by the local council to design and establish a park on what had been a weedy horse-paddock that had been earmarked for a caravan park. The aim of establishing the park was to collect in one area a wide and representative selection of the flora native to the area.

On 7 June 1980 the mayor of Mullumbimby, Alderman Stan Robinson, planted the first tree in the arboretum, a Red Cedar, symbolically launching Brunswick Valley Heritage Park.

Since its inception volunteers have established and maintained the park. They have propagated and planted trees native to the local area, and the arboretum now boasts 300 local species including 40 species with a conservation status.

Management of the park is now overseen by Brunswick Valley Landcare.

Location 
Brunswick Valley Heritage Park is a 4 hectare (10 acre) riverside park in the township of Mullumbimby. Access to the arboretum is from Brunswick Terrace and Tyagarah Street; access to the boat ramp and children's playground is via Mill Street on the north side of town.

Gallery

See also 
 Bundjalung people
 List of Australian place names of Aboriginal origin
 Northern Rivers
 List of botanical gardens in Australia

External links 
 Brunswick Valley Landcare Inc
 Byron Shire Council

References 

Arboreta in Australia
Botanical gardens in New South Wales
Parks in New South Wales
Northern Rivers
1980 establishments in Australia